Eye autofocus may refer to:

 Face detection system used to focus on the subject's eyes
 Eye-controlled focusing, where focusing is controlled by the photographer's eyes
 Eye tracking is the process of measuring either the point of [[Gaze (physiology)|gaze] or the motion of an eye relative to the head